Lloyd Jeffery Zaske (born October 6, 1960) is a former professional baseball pitcher. Zaskee appeared in three games in Major League Baseball for the Pittsburgh Pirates in 1984 at the age of 23. He batted right-handed and threw right-handed. He was born in Seattle, Washington.

External links

Pura Pelota (Venezuelan Winter League)

1961 births
Living people
Albuquerque Dukes players
Alexandria Dukes players
American expatriate baseball players in Mexico
Baseball players from Seattle
Buffalo Bisons (minor league) players
Hawaii Islanders players
Lynn Pirates (1983) players
Major League Baseball pitchers
Mexican League baseball pitchers
Navegantes del Magallanes players
American expatriate baseball players in Venezuela
Oklahoma City 89ers players
Pittsburgh Pirates players
Salem Pirates players
Shelby Pirates players
Tacoma Tigers players
Tulsa Drillers players
Tuneros de San Luis Potosí players